The Ekman water bottle is a sea water temperature sample device. The cylinder is dropped at the desired depth, the trap door below is opened to let the water enter and then closed tightly. This can be repeated at different depths as each sample goes to a different chamber of the insulated bottle.

It was used for greater depths during the research cruises of 1903 and 1904. The first instruments made, however, were too delicate; after being used for some time, the brass rods which press the lids towards both ends of the cylinder and close the water-bottle, became bent and therefore did not work sufficiently well. For this reason the instruments had to be frequently tested and repaired. As they are now made, they work very well and are very easily handled.

References

See also

 Oceanography
 Vagn Walfrid Ekman
 Ekman spiral
 Ekman current meter
 Nansen bottle

Oceanographic instrumentation